El Barrio de La Soledad  is a town and municipality in Oaxaca in south-western Mexico. The municipality covers an area of 233.48 km².  
It is part of the Juchitán District in the west of the Istmo de Tehuantepec region

As of 2005, the municipality had a total population of 13,439.

References

Municipalities of Oaxaca